Hermogenes Cendaña Esperon Jr. (born February 9, 1952) is a retired Philippine Army general who served as the National Security Adviser in the Cabinet of President Rodrigo Duterte from 2016 to 2022. He was the Chief of Staff of the Armed Forces of the Philippines from 2006 to 2008 and Commanding General of the Philippine Army from 2005 to 2006 under President Gloria Macapagal Arroyo. After his retirement from the military, he served in Arroyo's administration as the Presidential Adviser on the Peace Process and later as the head of the Presidential Management Staff.

Professional experience 

Esperon's professional government experience includes:
 Presidential Management Staff, 2009-2010
 Office of The Presidential Adviser on The Peace Process (OPAPP), 2008
 Chief of Staff, Armed Forces of The Philippines (CSAFP), 2006-2008
 Commanding General, Philippine Army (CGPA), 2005-2006
 Special Operations Command (SOCOM), 2004-2005
 7th Infantry Division, PA, (Fort Magsaysay, Nueva Ecija), 2004
 Deputy chief of staff for operations (J3, AFP), 2003-2004
 Group commander, Presidential Security Group (PSG), AFP, 2002-2003
 103rd Infantry Brigade, 1st Infantry Division, PA (Basilan), 2001
 602nd Infantry Brigade, 6th Infantry Division, PA (Carmen, Cotabato), 2000-2001
 Assistant chief of staff for operations (G3, PA), 1999-2000
 Chief, Joint Operations Center (JOC), General Headquarters, AFP, 1998-1999
 Deputy group commander (PSG), AFP, 1996–1998.
 Commander Presidential Escorts (PSG), AFP, 1997-1998 Concurrent
 Task Group Commander, Task Force Asia-Pacific Economic Cooperation (APEC), 1996
 Chief of Intelligence Staff, Southern Command (SOUTHCOM, Currently WESTMINCOM), AFP (Zamboanga City), 1995-1996
 Deputy for Operations (G3, PA), 1993
 Battalion Commander, 30th Infantry Battalion, 4th Infantry Division (Agusan), 1991 -1993
 Commander, Counterintelligence Group, PA, 1990-1991
 Staff, Southern Command (SOUTHCOM, Currently WESTMINCOM), AFP (Zamboanga City), 1989-1990
 Intelligence Staff Chief, 7th Infantry Division, PA (Currently Northern Luzon Command - NoLCom, Camp Aquino, Tarlac), 1987-1989
 National Intelligence and Security Authority (Currently National Intelligence Coordinating Agency - NICA), 1977- 1982
 Commander, B Co., 36th Infantry Battalion, 4th Infantry Division (Basilan, Sulu, Zamboanga), 1975-1977
 Platoon Leader, B Co., 23rd Infantry Battalion, 4th Infantry Division (Basilan, Sulu), 1974 -1975
 Cadet, Philippine Military Academy (PMA), 1970-1974

Education and training 

Esperon's education and training include:
 Philippine Science High School, "Pisay Dos" Class of 1970
 Philippine Military Academy "Marangal" Class, 1974
 Jungle Warfare and Mountain Operations Course, Philippine Army, 1973
 Infantry Officer Basic Course, 1974
 Intelligence Officer Basic Course, ISAFP, 1976
 Integrated Service Attache Course, DFA, 1981
 Master's in Business Administration, University of the Philippines, 1981-1982 (DNF)
 Infantry Officer Advance Course, 1986
 Master's in Management, Philippine Christian University, 1995
 Joint Services Command and General Staff Course, AFP, 1996

Awards and recognition 

Esperon's awards include:

  Philippine Republic Presidential Unit Citation
  Long Service Medal
  Order of Lakandula Grand Cross (Bayani) President of the Philippines, 2010
  Presidential Award of the Yudha Dharma, Republic of Indonesia, 2009
 King's Award of Malaysia, 2007
 Lagablab Award, Philippine Science High School, 2001
  Presidential Medal of Merit, 1998
 PMA Cavalier Award (as outstanding alumnus of the Philippine Military Academy)
  Eleven Distinguished Service Star
  Four Philippine Legion of Honor
  Two  Outstanding Achievement Medal (OAM)
  Four Gold Cross Medals
 Five Bronze Cross Medals
 Three Command Plaque
  Gawad sa Kaunlaran Award
 Three Outstanding Service Awards
 Plaque of Merit
   Military Commendation Medal
  Luzon Anti Dissidence Campaign Medal
  Visayas Anti-Dissidence Campaign Medal
  Mindanao Anti-dissidence Campaign Medal
 Grand Military Awards conferred by the President of Indonesia
 Grand Military Awards conferred by the Yang di-Pertuan Agong of Malaysia
  Disaster Relief and Rehabilitation Operations Ribbon
  - Military Civic Action Medal

Present affiliations 

 Consultant, Phoenix Petroleum Philippines Inc., 2015
 Executive Vice President for Administration, Manila Bulletin, 2012–present
 Partner, RVS 4-Star Maricultured Coral Farms, 2012–present 
 Lifetime member, Philippine Military Courses; Handicap 12

Political career 

Esperon ran for a position as Congressman in the 6th District of Pangasinan in the past May 2010 elections but lost.

Controversies

Irked by Partylist Representatives Satur Ocampo and Liza Maza's opposition to his bid to seek a congressional seat in the May polls, outgoing Presidential Management Staff Chief Hermogenes Esperon Jr. demanded that the two lawmakers, who are also seeking seats in the Senate, to come clean about their links with the underground leftist "legal fronts" known to be connected with the Communist Party of the Philippines - New people's Army (CPP-NPA).

Esperon said he was "proud of his achievements as a former Armed Forces’ chief of staff, especially in the government's fight against the communist insurgency".

As the assistant chief of staff for operations, J3 at General Headquarters, AFP; Esperon was implicated during the 2004 alleged election fraud. He was mentioned in taped conversations called the "Garci Tapes"  to have worked for the relief of a brigade commander in Lanao who was not sympathetic to then presidential candidate Macapagal-Arroyo. However, his involvement has not been proven.

References

External links
 Jun Esperon's official website: Tapat Maglingkod

1952 births
Living people
Arroyo administration cabinet members
Chairmen of the Joint Chiefs (Philippines)
Duterte administration cabinet members
Filipino generals
Grand Crosses of the Order of Lakandula
Heads of the Presidential Management Staff of the Philippines
Manila Bulletin people
National Security Advisers of the Philippines
People from Pangasinan
Philippine Christian University alumni
Philippine Military Academy alumni
Presidential Advisers on the Peace Process of the Philippines
Recipients of Gawad sa Kaunlaran
Recipients of the Presidential Medal of Merit (Philippines)
University of the Philippines alumni